The pastel-green wrasse (Halichoeres chloropterus), also known as the black-blotched rainbowfish, black=blotched wrasse, dark-blotch wrasse or green-spotted wrasse, is a species of wrasse native to the central western Pacific Ocean. Its coloration varies depending upon the habitat in which it occurs, ranging from bright green in fish living in areas with heavy algal growth to pale or with dark bars for those inhabiting rubble areas. This species can reach  in standard length. It is of minor importance to local commercial fisheries and can  be found in the aquarium trade.

References

External links
 

pastel-green wrasse
Taxa named by Marcus Elieser Bloch
Fish described in 1791